Sapho may refer to:

Sapho (damselfly), genus of insects
SAPHO syndrome, chronic disease with synovitis, acne, pustulosis, hyperostosis and osteitis

People
Madeleine de Scudéry (1607–1701), French writer who used the pseudonym Sapho
Sapho (singer) (born 1950), French singer

Arts
Sapho (Gounod), 1851 opera by Charles Gounod
Sapho (Massenet), 1897 opera by Jules Massenet, based on Daudet's novel
Sapho (novel) (1884), by Alphonse Daudet
Sapho (play), 1900 play by Clyde Fitch
Queen Sapho, a main character in the 1584 Elizabethan play Sapho and Phao
Sapho (1913 film), a lost 1913 silent film feature drama
Sapho (1917 film), a 1917 American silent drama film
Sapho (1934 film), a 1934 French drama film
Sapho juice, a stimulant drug in the fictional Dune universe

See also
Sappho (6th century BC), Greek lyric poet
Sappho (disambiguation)
Saffo (disambiguation)